Spanish submarine Isaac Peral is the name used by four submarines in the Spanish navy after captain and submarine pioneer Isaac Peral.

  was an American-made submarine in commission between 1917 and 1932
  was in commission between 1928 and 1950
 , was a  used during World War II; updated to Guppy IIA, and in commission between 1971 and 1987
  is an  currently under construction

See also
  was an experimental submarine in commission between 1888 and 1890

Spanish Navy ship names